Mehr (also known as Mīhr) is a village in Mehr Rural District, Bashtin District, Davarzan County, Razavi Khorasan Province, Iran. At the 2006 census, its population was 1,361, in 394 families.

See also
Adur Burzen-Mihr
Mehr Caravanserai

References 

Populated places in Davarzan County